Cristian Gutiérrez may refer to:

Cristian Gutiérrez (footballer, born 1994), Nicaraguan footballer
Cristian Gutiérrez (footballer, born 2000), Spanish footballer
Cristián Gutiérrez (soccer, born 1997), Chilean-Canadian footballer